Pece Trajkovski – Brada (born May 27, 1981 in Bitola, Macedonia, Yugoslavia) is a Macedonian musician. He is the lead accordion / guitar / synth player and co-author of the band Foltin since 1999. As a Foltin member, so far, Brada worked on 8 studio albums, music for over 20 theater pieces, several film scores (including the 92nd Academy Awards two categories nominee / three Sundance 2019 awards winner Honeyland and the internationally acclaimed with 9 wins and 26 nominations Secret Ingredient)  and plenty of live performances on festivals, events, clubs etc.

Discography
Donkey Hot (2003)
Lo-Lee-Taa-Too (2005)
Ovaa Transplantirana masina za čukanje dosega ne tipkala ljubovno pismo (2008)
Penelope X (2011) *joined project with Nikola Kodjabashija and Goce Stefkovski
Antitelo (2012)
Pijan Slavej (2015)
MOMÓMA (2019)
Honeyland Suite (2020)
Theatre Miniatures (2020)
Simultan Baknezh (2021)

Theatre

2022 - DECAMERON, directed by: Martin Kocovski // National Theater 'Voydan Chernodrinski', Prilep, Macedonia
2019 – ARABIAN NIGHT, directed by: Zoja Buzalkovska // National Theater 'Voydan Chernodrinski', Prilep, Macedonia
2017 –  Les Misérables, directed by: Martin Kocovski // National Theater 'Voydan Chernodrinski', Prilep, Macedonia
2015 –  LEPA VIDA, directed by: Miha Nemec // SNG Nova Gorica, SSG Trieste, PG Kranj, Slovenija
2015 – THE GOOD PERSON OF SZECHWAN, directed by: Aleksandar Popovski // MGL, Ljubljana, Slovenija
2014 – ŽIVIO HARMS, ČUDA POSTOJE, directed by: Aleksandar Popovski // KEREMPUH, Zagreb, Croatia
2013 – SCHWEIK IIN THE SECOND WORLD WAR, directed by: Martin Kocovski // National Theater 'Voydan Chernodrinski', Prilep, Macedonia
2013 – MISTERIJ BUFFO, directed by: Aleksandar Popovski // SNG Drama, Ljubljana, Slovenia
2012 – ODYSSEUS, directed by: Aleksandar Popovski // Ulysses Theatre, Brioni, Croatia
2012 – SPRING AWAKENING, directed by: Martin Kocovski // Народно Позориште, Uzice, Serbia
2011 – LEKSIKON OF YU MITOLOGY, directed by: Oliver Frljic // NETA
2011 – BAAL, directed by: Martin Kocovski // Dramski Theater, Skopje, Macedonia
2010 – CIRKUS DESTETIKA, directed by: Aleksandar Popovski // HNK Rijeka, Croatia
2010 – CAUCASIAN CHALK CIRCLE, directed by: Martin Kocovski // National Theater 'Voydan Chernodrinski', Prilep, Macedonia
2010 – PEER GYNT, directed by: Aleksandar Popovski // Gavella, Zagreb, Croatia
2009 – BOAT FOR DOLLS, directed by: Aleksandar Popovski // SNG Drama, Ljubljana, Slovenia
2009 – SWAN SONG, directed by: Branko Stavrev // Dramski Theater, Skopje, Macedonia
2009 – THE OTHER SIDE, directed by: Martin Kocovski // NETA
2008 – DRUMS IN THE NIGHT, directed by: Martin Kocovski // National Theater 'Voydan Chernodrinski', Prilep, Macedonia
2002 – FAMILY STORIES, directed by: Aleksandra Kovacevic // National Theater of Bitola, Macedonia
2002 – DON QUIXOTE IN A DUTCH DISCOTEQUE, directed by: Sasho Milenkovski // National Theater of Kumanovo, Macedonia
2001 – BAKHI, directed by: Sasho Milenkovski // National Theater of Bitola, Macedonia
2001 – Comme Moi LE PIAF, directed by: Natasha Poplavska // National Theater of Bitola, Macedonia
2001 – MACEDOINE, Odyssey 2001, directed by: Ivan Popovski // Ohrid Summer, Ohrid, Macedonia
1999  – MACEDONIAN BLOODY WEDDING, directed by: Ljupcho Georgievski // National Theater of Bitola, Macedonia

Film Music
2019 - Honeyland (score), directed by: Ljubomir Stefanovski and Tamara Kotevska (Honeyland won three awards at the 2019 Sundance Film Festival plus 27 other international wins and 38 nominations, also is nominated for Best Documentary and Best International Feature Film at the 92nd Academy Awards)
2017 - Secret Ingredient (score), directed by: Gjorce Stavreski (Secret ingredient won 9 international festival awards and 26 nominations)
2017 - Lake of Apples (score), directed by: Ljubomir Stefanovski
2017 - Avec L'Amoure (score), directed by: Ilija Cvetkovski
2016 - The Liberation of Skopje (actor/musician), directed by: Danilo and Rade Sherbedzija
2014 - To the Hilt, (as instrumentalist), directed by: Stole Popov
2012 – The Balkan is not dead (as actor), directed by: Aleksandar Popovski, production: Kino Oko
2010 – This Is Not An American Movie (score),  directed by: Sasho Pavlovski, production: Dejan Iliev
2008 – Cash And Marry,  (score) directed by: Atanas Georgiev, production: Mischief Films, Nukleus, Tris Films and ITVS International
2008 – Dance With Me (soundtrack), directed by: Sasha A. Damjanovski, production: Orev films
2005 – Turkish Tea (documentary) (soundtrack), directed by: Petra Seliskar, production: "Petra Pan", Slovenia

Festivals (short list) 
EXIT FESTIVAL (Novi Sad, Serbia) – SZIGET FESTIVAL (Budapest, Hungary)  – EUPEN MUSIK MARATHON Festival (Eupen, Belgium) – BJCEM - Association Biennale Des Jeunes Créateurs de l`Europe et de la Méditerranée (Napoli, Italy) – JEUX DE LA FRANCOPHONIE (Beirut, Lebanon) –  INTERNATIONAL JAZZ FESTIVAL (Cerkno, Slovenia) –  BEOGRADSKI JAZZ FESTIVAL (Beograd, Serbia) – "UNDER THE MACEDONIAN SUN" (Prague, Czech) – KINO UNTER STERNEN (Wien, Austria) – BELGRADE BEER FEST (Beograd, Serbia) – EUROPE ON WATER (Istanbul, Turkey)  – SEMAINE CORSE BALKANS (Ajaccio, Corse, France) – APOLONIA ART FESTIVAL (Sozopol, Bulgaria) – BALKAN FEVER FESTIVAL (Wien, Austria) – INTERZONE FESTIVAL (Novi Sad, Serbia) – INTERNATIONAL FILM FESTIVAL, "PALIC" (Subotica, Serbia) – EX - PONTO International theatre festival (Ljubljana, Slovenia) – FESTIVAL OBZIDJA (Piran, Slovenija) – DRUGA GODBA (Ljubljana, Slovenia) – PARK IN ZAGREB Festival (Zagreb, Croatia) – 40 ANS DE JUMELAGE AVEC LA VILLE DE BITOLA (Epinal, France) – AMADEO SUMMER SCENE (Zagreb, Croatia)  – ETHNOMUS, International World Music Festival (Jagodina, Serbia)  –  OHRID SUMMER FESTIVAL, (Ohrid, Macedonia) – MANAKI BROTHERS FILM FESTIVAL (Bitola, Macedonia) – TAKSIRAT (Skopje, Macedonia) – SKOPSKO LETO (Skopje, Macedonia) – KELTIKA FESTIVAL (Cerkno, Slovenia) – OFF-FEST (Skopje, Macedonia)  – KUMANOVO JAZZ FESTIVAL (Kumanovo, Macedonia) – KAMFEST (Kamnik, Slovenia) – PRINTEMPS BALKANIQUE (Caen, France) – ALARM FESTIVAL (Ohrid, Macedonia) – FESTIVAL THE OTHER SIDE (Dodoši, Montenegro) – The European LIFE I LIVE (Den Haag, Netherlands) – GIFFONI FILM FESTIVAL (Salerno, Italy) – 36. DAYS OF MACEDONIAN MUSIC (as "Penelope X") (Skopje, Macedonia) –  WAKEUP! Bulgaria Open Air festival (Bulgaria) – FRANCOFOLIES (Blagoevgrad, Bulgaria) –  KAPANA FEST (Plovdiv, Bulgaria) – TABOR FILM FEST (Zagorje, Croatia) – INTER:KOMM! Open air (Reutlingen, Germany) – KULTURFESTIVAL GRAFELFING (Munich, Germany) – MUSIC MEETING (Nijmegen, Netherlands)...

References 

Macedonian musicians
Avant-garde accordionists
1981 births
Living people
People from Bitola
21st-century accordionists